The Acoustic Adrian Belew is the seventh solo album by Adrian Belew, released in 1993. While Belew is predominantly known as an experimental electric guitarist who usually utilizes electronic effects, this album was an effort to feature his skills as a solo performer/songwriter/interpreter. Belew plays all the songs on acoustic guitar (with very minimal overdubs). At under 30 minutes, it is Adrian Belew's shortest album.

The album features new versions of songs from Belew's past (including 'Matte Kudasai', which he originally recorded with King Crimson), and two cover versions (a Beatles song, and a Roy Orbison tune). Of the four new songs on the record, both 'Burned By the Fire We Make' and 'Dream Life' would appear in full electric versions on Belew's next album Here the following year; 'Peace On Earth' is a rearrangement of 'Tango Zebra' (from Belew's 1986 instrumental album Desire Caught By the Tail) with new lyrics; and 'Martha Adored' is a tape-reversed presentation of an earlier album track ('Dream Life'), with additional overdubs.

Track listing
 "The Lone Rhinoceros" (Belew) – 2:37
 "Peace on Earth" (Belew) – 2:49
 "The Man in the Moon" (Belew) – 2:12
 "The Rail Song" (Belew) - 3:42
 "If I Fell" (Lennon–McCartney) – 2:18
 "Burned by the Fire We Make" (Belew) – 2:50
 "Matte Kudasai" (Belew, Bill Bruford, Robert Fripp, Tony Levin) – 2:18
 "Dream Life" (Belew) – 2:19
 "Old Fat Cadillac" (Belew) – 3:12
 "Crying" (Roy Orbison, Joe Melson) – 2:39
 "Martha Adored" (Belew) – 2:19

Personnel

Musician
 Adrian Belew – acoustic guitar, vocals

Technical
 Adrian Belew – producer
 Noah Evens – engineer

References

Adrian Belew albums
1993 albums
Albums produced by Adrian Belew